Anastasia Romanova (born 11 October 1993, Tumanny, Murmansk Oblast, Russia) is a Russian alpine ski racer.

She competed at the 2015 World Championships in Beaver Creek, USA, in the giant slalom.

References

1993 births
Russian female alpine skiers
Living people
People from Kolsky District
People from Kirovsk, Murmansk Oblast
Sportspeople from Murmansk Oblast